Box turtle species could refer to:

 Species of the North America box turtles of the genus Terrapene
 Species of the Asian box turtles of the genus Cuora.